Vansda National Park, also known as Bansda National Park, is a protected area which represents the thick woodlands of the Dangs and southern Gujarat, and is situated in the Vansda tehsil, Navsari District of Gujarat state, India. Riding on the banks of Ambika River and measuring roughly 24 km2 in area, the park lies about 65 km east of the town of Chikhali on the National Highway 8, and about 80 km northeast of the city of Valsad. Vansda, the town from which the name of the park is derived, is an important trading place for the surrounding area where the majority of the population is represented by adivasis. Vansda-Waghai state highway runs through the park, so does the narrow gauge rail link connecting Ahwa to Billimora.

Established in 1979 as a National Park, the deciduous forest area having groves of "Katas" bamboo owes its beauty to no felling of trees since 1952. Nestled in the Western Ghats of Sahyadri range, it has a unique flavour of flora and fauna population.

Apart from the botanical garden, some of the other attractions include local tribes, "Gira Falls", and the "Conservation center". As a part of developing ecotourism Gujarat Government has developed a campsite at Kilad. There is also a deer breeding center maintained by Nature Club Surat in this region.

The best time to visit is post-monsoon season till winter when the forests are lush green and streams are full.

Fauna
Animals found in the park include the Indian leopard, dhole, rhesus macaque, common palm civet, Hanuman langur, small Indian civet, four-horned antelope, wild boar, Indian porcupine, barking deer, striped hyena, jungle cat, flying squirrel, pangolin and Indian giant squirrel. Pythons and venomous snakes such as the Russell's viper, cobras and kraits can also be found.

In 1992, a rusty-spotted cat was spotted in a farmhouse at a plantation of mangoes in this park. In February 2020, dholes were sighted in the park, with camera traps confirming the presence of two individuals in May 2020. This was the first time in 50 years that dholes were confirmed in Gujarat.

Like Purna Wildlife Sanctuary in the Dangs' Forest, and Shoolpaneshwar Wildlife Sanctuary, the Bengal tiger is reportedly extinct in the State of Gujarat. However, since the area where the state borders Maharashtra and Madhya Pradesh has tigers anyway, the forest is a potential habitat of the tiger.

Here, a high diversity of species of forest birds is the main attraction for ecotourism. About 155 species of birds are found including common grey hornbill, grey-fronted green pigeon, yellow backed sunbird, Malabar trogon, jungle babbler, forest spotted owlet, shama, great Indian black woodpecker, are found. Apart from this, there is a variety of insects, centipedes, millipedes and snails. There are about 121 species of spider including the giant wood spider, the largest species of spider in Gujarat.

Flora
There are 443 species of flowering plants. This includes teak, sadad, kadad, humb, timru, kalam, bamboo, dudhkod, mahudo, behada, umaro, kusum, tanach, asan, shimlo, ambla, sisam, chopadi bondaro, etc. There is a variety of colourful orchids at Ambika river.

Gallery

See also
 List of national parks and wildlife sanctuaries of Gujarat, India
 Arid Forest Research Institute
 Janki van

References

External links
 Gujarat Tourism: Vansda National Park
Photos, Contact and Booking Information: Vansda National Park, Surat, Gujarat

National parks in Gujarat
Protected areas established in 1979
Navsari district
1979 establishments in Gujarat